Tun Veli is an uninhabited Croatian island in the Adriatic Sea located southeast of Molat.

References

Islands of the Adriatic Sea
Islands of Croatia
Landforms of Zadar County
Uninhabited islands of Croatia